Richard Roett (18 January 1943 – December 2002) was a Barbadian cyclist. He competed in the individual road race at the 1968 Summer Olympics.

References

External links
 

1943 births
2002 deaths
Barbadian male cyclists
Olympic cyclists of Barbados
Cyclists at the 1968 Summer Olympics